Neoclytus caprea is a species of beetle in the family Cerambycidae. It was described by Say in 1824. It feeds on sapwood of ash, sometimes oak, hickory. It often emerges indoors from firewood; logs may become infested within 20 days of felling during summer.

Adult 8-17 mm, larva up to 22 mm. One generation a year.

References

 Bugguide.net. Species Neoclytus caprea - Banded Ash Borer

caprea
Beetles described in 1824